Lisa Kereszi (born 1973) is an American photographer and professor from Pennsylvania.

Life and work
Kereszi grew up in Pennsylvania where her father owned a junk yard in Trainer and her mother owned and ran an antique store. Kereszi earned a BA from Bard College working with Stephen Shore and others. After graduating from Bard, she began working as an assistant to Nan Goldin. After NYC, she attended Yale University in 2000 to earn an MFA. She has been associated with the university since 2004 as faculty.

Her work uses color photography and deals with both fantasy and the idea of home. In the realm of fantasy or "places around the cultural fringe", her projects have included haunted houses both operating and during daylight hours, burlesque dancers, and strip clubs. For work about home, she photographed her grandfather's junk yard, culminating in a book published in 2012 about which The New York Times remarked the junkyard was "a perfect place for an artist to be born."

She has done commissions for Yale University, T: The New York Times Style Magazine, and Orion. Her commercial clients include Nike, IBM, and Capitol Records.

Publications
 Governors Island: Photographs by Lisa Kereszi & Andrew Moore. New York City: Public Art Fund, 2005. .
 Fun and Games. Nazraeli Press, 2009. .
 Joe's Junk Yard. Damiani, 2012. .
 Lisa Kereszi: The More I Learn About Women. J&L Books, 2014. .

Collections
Kereszi's work is held in the following permanent public collections:

 Whitney Museum of American Art, New York City
 Ogden Museum of Southern Art, New Orleans, LA
 Yale University Art Gallery, New Haven, CT
 Brooklyn Museum, Brooklyn, New York City

References

External links
 
 Lisa Kereszi Representation: Yancey Richardson

1973 births
Living people
American critics
American women photographers
Bard College alumni
People from Chester, Pennsylvania
Yale University faculty
Journalists from Pennsylvania
American women academics
21st-century American women
Yale School of Art alumni